The Gold Rush is a 1925 American silent comedy film written, produced, and directed by Charlie Chaplin. The film also stars Chaplin in his Little Tramp persona, Georgia Hale, Mack Swain, Tom Murray, Henry Bergman, and Malcolm Waite.

Chaplin drew inspiration from photographs of the Klondike Gold Rush as well as from the story of the Donner Party who, when snowbound in the Sierra Nevada, were driven to cannibalism or eating leather from their shoes. Chaplin, who believed tragedies and comics were not far from each other, decided to combine these stories of deprivation and horror in comedy. He decided that his famous rogue figure should become a gold-digger who joins a brave optimist determined to face all the pitfalls associated with the search for gold, such as sickness, hunger, cold, loneliness, or the possibility that he may at any time be attacked by a grizzly. In the film, scenes like Chaplin cooking and dreaming of his shoe, or how his starving friend Big Jim sees him as a chicken could be seen.

The Gold Rush was critically acclaimed upon its release, and continues to be one of Chaplin's most celebrated works; Chaplin himself cited it several times as the film for which he most wanted to be remembered. In 1942, Chaplin re-released a version with sound effects, music, and narration, which received Academy Award nominations for Best Music Score and Best Sound Recording. In 1958, the film was voted number 2 on the prestigious Brussels 12 list at the 1958 World Expo, by a margin of only 5 votes behind Battleship Potemkin. In 1992, the film was selected for preservation in the United States National Film Registry by the Library of Congress as being "culturally, historically, or aesthetically significant".

In 1953, the original 1925 version of the film entered the public domain in the United States because the claimants did not renew its copyright registration in the 28th year after publication.

Plot 
The following is the plot of the 1942 re-release:

Big Jim, a gold prospector during the Klondike Gold Rush, in Alaska, has just found an enormous gold deposit on his parcel of land when a blizzard strikes. The Lone Prospector gets lost in the same blizzard while also prospecting for gold. He stumbles into the cabin of Black Larsen, a wanted criminal. Larsen tries to throw the Prospector out when Jim also stumbles inside. Larsen tries to scare both out using his shotgun but is overpowered by Jim, and the three agree to an uneasy truce allowing them all to stay in the cabin.

When the storm is taking so long that food is running out, the three draw lots for who will have to go out into the blizzard to obtain something to eat. Larsen loses and leaves the cabin. While outside looking for food, he encounters Jim's gold deposit and decides to ambush him there when Jim returns.

Meanwhile, the two remaining in the cabin get so desperate that they cook and eat one of the Prospector's shoes. Later, Jim gets delirious, imagines the Prospector as a giant chicken and attacks him. At that moment, a bear enters the cabin and is killed, supplying them with food.

After the storm subsides, both leave the cabin, the Prospector continuing on to the next gold boom town while Jim returns to his gold deposit. There, he is knocked out by Larsen with a shovel. While fleeing with some of the mined gold, Larsen is killed by an avalanche. Jim recovers consciousness and wanders into the snow, having lost his memory from the blow. When he returns to the town, his memory has been partly restored and he remembers that he had found a large gold deposit, that the deposit was close to a certain cabin, and that he had stayed in the cabin with the Prospector. But he knows neither the location of the deposit nor of the cabin, and so goes out looking for the Prospector, hoping that he can lead him to the cabin.

The Prospector arrives at the town and encounters Georgia, a dance hall girl. To irritate Jack, a ladies' man who is making aggressive advances toward her and is pestering her for a dance, she instead decides to dance with "the most deplorable looking tramp in the dance hall", the Prospector, who instantly falls in love with her. After encountering each other again, she accepts his invitation for a New Year's Eve dinner, but does not take it seriously and soon forgets about it. On New Year's Eve, while waiting for her to arrive to the dinner, the Prospector imagines entertaining her with a dance of bread rolls on forks. When she does not arrive until midnight, he walks alone through the streets, desperate. At that moment, she remembers his invitation and decides to visit him. Finding his home empty but seeing the meticulously prepared dinner and a present for her, she has a change of heart and prepares a note for him in which she asks to talk to him.

When the Prospector is handed the note, he goes searching for Georgia. But at the same moment, Jim finds him and drags him away to go search for the cabin, giving the Prospector only enough time to shout to Georgia that he soon will return to her as a millionaire. Jim and the Prospector find the cabin and stay for the night. Overnight, another blizzard blows the cabin half over a cliff right next to Jim's gold deposit. The next morning the cabin is rocking dangerously over the cliff edge while the two try to escape. At last Jim manages to get out and pull the Prospector to safety right when the cabin falls off the cliff.

One year later both have become wealthy, but the Prospector never was able to find Georgia. They return to the contiguous United States on a ship on which, unknown to them, Georgia is also traveling. When the Prospector agrees to don his old clothes for a photograph, he falls down the stairs, encountering Georgia once more. After she mistakenly thinks he is a stowaway and tries to save him from the ship's crew, the misunderstanding is cleared up and both are happily reunited.

Cast
 Charles Chaplin (as The Tramp) as The Lone Prospector
 Mack Swain as Big Jim McKay
 Tom Murray as Black Larsen
 Malcolm Waite as Jack Cameron
 Georgia Hale as The Girl, Georgia
 Henry Bergman as Hank Curtis
 Tiny Sandford as Barman (uncredited)
 Sam Allen as Man in Dance Hall (uncredited)

Production 
Chaplin attempted to film many of the scenes on location near Truckee, California, in early 1924. He abandoned most of this footage, which included the Lone Prospector being chased through snow by Big Jim, instead of just around the hut as in the final film, retaining only the film's opening scene. The final film was shot on the back lot and stages at Chaplin's Hollywood studio, where elaborate Klondike sets were constructed.

Lita Grey, whom Chaplin married in November 1924, was originally cast as the leading lady but was replaced by Georgia Hale due to her pregnancy; she appeared in the film as an extra.

Discussing the making of the film in the documentary series Unknown Chaplin, Hale revealed that the marriage had collapsed during production of the film; the final scene of the original version, in which the two kiss, reflected the state of his relationship with Hale by that time.

Box office 
The Gold Rush was a huge success in the US and worldwide. It is the fifth-highest-grossing silent film in cinema history, earning more than $4,250,001 at the box office in 1926. Chaplin proclaimed at the time of its release that this was the film for which he wanted to be remembered.

It earned United Artists $1 million and Chaplin himself a profit of $2 million.

Critical reception 

Critics generally praised the original 1925 release of The Gold Rush. Mordaunt Hall wrote in The New York Times:

Variety also published a rave review, saying that it was "the greatest and most elaborate comedy ever filmed, and will stand for years as the biggest hit in its field, just as The Birth of a Nation still withstands the many competitors in the dramatic class."

The New Yorker published a mixed review, believing that the dramatic elements of the film did not work well alongside Chaplin's familiar slapstick:

Nevertheless, The New Yorker included The Gold Rush in its year-end list of the ten best films of 1925.

At the 1958 Brussels World Fair, critics rated it the second greatest film in history, behind only Sergei Eisenstein's Battleship Potemkin. In 1992, The Gold Rush was selected for preservation in the United States National Film Registry by the Library of Congress as being "culturally, historically, or aesthetically significant".

Chaplin biographer Jeffrey Vance considers The Gold Rush to be Chaplin's greatest work of the silent-film era. Vance writes, "The Gold Rush is arguably his greatest and most ambitious silent film; it was the longest and most expensive comedy produced up to that time.  The film contains many of Chaplin's most celebrated comedy sequences, including the boiling and eating of his shoe, the dance of the rolls, and the teetering cabin.  However, the greatness of The Gold Rush does not rest solely on its comedy sequences but on the fact that they are integrated so fully into a character-driven narrative. Chaplin had no reservations about the finished product.  Indeed, in the contemporary publicity for the film, he is quoted, 'This is the picture that I want to be remembered by.'"

The Japanese filmmaker Akira Kurosawa cited The Gold Rush as one of his favorite films.

The film is recognized by American Film Institute in these lists:
 1998: AFI's 100 Years... 100 Movies – #74
 2000: AFI's 100 Years... 100 Laughs – #25
 2007: AFI's 100 Years... 100 Movies (10th Anniversary Edition) – #58

The Village Voice ranked The Gold Rush at No. 49 in its Top 250 "Best Films of the Century" list in 1999, based on a poll of critics. Entertainment Weekly voted it at No.15 on their list of 100 Greatest Movies of All Time. The film was voted at No. 97 on the list of "100 Greatest Films" by the prominent French magazine Cahiers du cinéma in 2008. In the 2012 Sight & Sound polls, it was ranked the 91st-greatest film ever made in the directors' poll. In 2015, The Gold Rush ranked 17th on BBC's "100 Greatest American Films" list, voted on by film critics from around the world. The film was voted at No. 25 on the list of The 100 greatest comedies of all time by a poll of 253 film critics from 52 countries conducted by the BBC in 2017.

1942 re-release 
In 1942, Chaplin released a new version of The Gold Rush, modifying the original silent 1925 film by adding a recorded musical score, adding a narration which he recorded himself, and tightening the editing, which reduced the film's running time by several minutes. The film was further shortened by being run at the 24 frames per second rate of sound films. Like most silent movies it was originally shot and exhibited at a slower speed. Chaplin also changed some plot points. Besides removing the ending kiss, another edit eliminated a subplot in which the Lone Prospector is tricked into believing Georgia is in love with him by Georgia's paramour, Jack.

The new music score by Max Terr and the sound recording by James L. Fields were nominated for Academy Awards in 1943.

The Gold Rush was the first of Chaplin's classic silent films that he converted to sound. The 2012 Blu-ray release revealed that the reissue of The Gold Rush preserved most of the footage from the original film. Even the restored print of the 1925 original shows noticeable degradation of image and missing frames, artifacts not seen in the 1942 version.

Copyright and home media 
In 1953, the original 1925 film may have entered the public domain in the US, as Chaplin did not renew its copyright registration in the 28th year after publication in accordance with American law at the time. As such, the film was once widely available on home video in the US. After 1995, Chaplin's estate blocked unauthorized releases of The Gold Rush in the United States by arguing that the film's U.S. copyright had been restored by the Uruguay Round Agreements Act. Regardless, in 2021, the original film definitively entered the public domain in the United States as 95 years had passed since its release.

In 2012, both the reconstruction of the 1925 silent version and the 1942 narrated reissue version were released on Blu-ray by the Criterion Collection. This set included a new audio commentary track by Chaplin biographer and scholar Jeffrey Vance.

In popular culture 
The "roll dance" that the Little Tramp character performs in the film is considered one of the more memorable scenes in film history; however, Roscoe Arbuckle did something similar in the 1917 movie The Rough House which co-starred Buster Keaton. Curly Howard made a brief homage to the bit in the 1935 Three Stooges film Pardon My Scotch. Anna Karina's character in Bande à part makes references to it before the famous dance scene. In more recent times, it was replicated by Robert Downey Jr. in his lead role as Charles Chaplin in the 1992 Chaplin, which briefly depicts the production of the film; Johnny Depp's character in the 1993 film Benny and Joon; Grampa Simpson in the 1994 The Simpsons episode "Lady Bouvier's Lover"; and Amy Adams's character in The Muppets. The sequence for the "hanging cabin on the edge of the cliff" (starting at 1:19 in video inserted above) has been used in two Indian movies: Michael Madana Kama Rajan and Welcome.

See also 
 List of films with a 100% rating on Rotten Tomatoes, a film review aggregator website

References

Further reading
'The Gold Rush' essay by Daniel Eagan in America's Film Legacy: The Authoritative Guide to the Landmark Movies in the National Film Registry, A&C Black, 2010 , pp. 99–101 America's Film Legacy: The Authoritative Guide to the Landmark Movies in the National Film Registry

External links 

 The Gold Rush essay by Darren R. Reid and Brett Sanders on the National Film Registry website
 
 
 
 
 
 
 United Artists Pressbook on the Internet Archive
 
 The Greatest Films: The Gold Rush
 Bibliography
 The Gold Rush: As Good as Gold an essay by Lucy Sante at the Criterion Collection

1925 films
1926 comedy films
1926 films
Silent American comedy films
American silent feature films
American black-and-white films
Films directed by Charlie Chaplin
Films set in Alaska
Films set in the 1890s
Films set in Yukon
Films shot in Colorado
Films about the Klondike Gold Rush
United Artists films
United States National Film Registry films
Northern (genre) films
Articles containing video clips
Surviving American silent films
1925 comedy films
1920s American films
1920s English-language films